Champagne Nightmares is the second studio album by Paranoid Castle, a hip hop duo consisting of Canadian producer Factor and American rapper Kirby Dominant. It was released on Fake Four Inc. in 2011. On August 25, 2011, URB premiered the music video for "Orca".

Critical reception
Steve Juon of RapReviews.com gave the album a 7.5 out of 10, saying, "It's hard not to recommend Paranoid Castle to everybody reading except for one thing: it's just not going to be boom bap enough for some or macho enough for others." Niela Orr of Okayplayer said, "The beats are one of the likable things on the album, and it's clear that Factor is intent on purposefully matching the tone of Dominant's swirly, machismo laced, man-boy bragging."

Track listing

References

External links
 

2011 albums
Fake Four Inc. albums
Albums produced by Factor (producer)